Missoula Downtown Historic District in Missoula, Montana is a  historic district which was listed on the National Register of Historic Places in 2009.  Its boundaries were changed in two revision listings in 2011.

Its original listing included 376 contributing buildings and four contributing sites.

References

Historic districts on the National Register of Historic Places in Montana
Late 19th and Early 20th Century American Movements architecture
Buildings and structures completed in 1883
National Register of Historic Places in Missoula, Montana